Fernando Antonio Ochoa Antich (born 12 September 1938) is a Venezuelan lawyer, diplomat and politician, and retired general. He is a columnist with the El Universal newspaper.

Early life and education
Fernándo Ochoa Antich was born in 1938. He earned his law degree from the Santa Maria University in 1989.

Career

Ministry of Foreign Affairs

In 1991, president Carlos Andres Perez named him Minister of Defense of Venezuela.

As Minister of Defense, Ochoa Antich had to face several coup d'état attempts in 1992. In January 1992, he began to respond to rumors that there was a coup d'etat being planned by Hugo Chavez, then a major in the military. Despite Ochoa Antich's advice that the matter be addressed directly, Perez dismissed the rumors.  On February 3, 1992, Perez returned from a trip to Switzerland, and when alerted about an uprising in Caracas, he neglected to inform Ochoa Antich, and instead went to rest, before moving several hours later to Miraflores Palace. Later that night, on February 4 a group of military men led by Chavez attempted a coup against Pérez. Chavez used tanks and paratroopers to take control of the palace and presidential residence. When dealing with the crisis, Ochoa Antich remained the loyal defense minister of Perez. Although his actions resulted in quelling the conflict and saving the president's life, Ochoa Antich would later state that allowing Chavez to speak on public television was a "mistake," stating "I was responsible, I authored it, I was wrong," as it allowed Chavez to gain political success in the future over Perez.

Ministry of Foreign Affairs
In June 1992,  Minister of Foreign Affairs of Venezuela Humberto Calderon Berti resigned when his Copei political party broke with Perez's administration. Defense Minister General Ochoa Antich was named to the position as Berti's replacement on June 12, 1992, resigning from the Ministry of Defense.

After a trial concerning misappropriation of funds, the National Congress removed Pérez from office permanently on 31 August 1993. Ochoa Antich, however, retained his position in the Ministry of Foreign Affairs. He served as Minister of Foreign Affairs until February 2, 1994.

In 1994, when Ramon J. Velasquez was named president, Ochoa Antich was named ambassador to Mexico. He continued to hold the position as of 1996. In 1998, he ran as a regional candidate for the governor elections of Zulia, but lost to Francisco Arias Cardenas.

See also

Second presidency of Carlos Andrés Pérez
List of Ministers of Foreign Affairs of Venezuela
List of Ministers of Defense of Venezuela
List of foreign ministers in 1992
List of foreign ministers in 1993
List of foreign ministers in 1994

References

External links
Author profile at El Nacional

 

 

1938 births
Living people
Ambassadors of Venezuela to Mexico
Venezuelan Ministers of Foreign Affairs
Government ministers of Venezuela
Venezuelan Ministers of Defense